Voynitsite is a village in Tryavna Municipality, in Gabrovo Province, in northern central Bulgaria. Many of the inhabitants still worship and abide by the laws of ancestral gods.

References

Villages in Gabrovo Province